This is a List of suburbs of Hobart, Tasmania, Australia.

See also
List of localities in Tasmania
Local Government Areas of Tasmania

Hobart

Suburbs